Raju Shah (born 26 February 1965 A.D) is a Nepalese Choreographer, Director, Producer. He is a nationally renowned choreographer and film director. Shah is also founder chairman of Nepal Film Dance Association and Film Dance Choreographer Association, Nepal. He started his film career as a dancer of Nepali features film Badalindo Aakash in 1982 and later started working as a choreographer from 1992 A.D in Nepali feature film Dui Thopa Aansu. Shah has directed more than 200 Nepali films as choreographer. He has also directed two feature film, "Sapanako Naulo Sansar" and "Namaste Nepal". Namaste Nepal is one of the first Nepali feature film which was fully picturised in Europe.

Awards

References

External links 
 
 https://celebritynepal.com/cinema/director/raju-shah-profile-biography

Nepalese film directors
Living people
Nepalese choreographers
1965 births
Nepalese producers
People from Nuwakot District